In enzymology, a mannosyl-3-phosphoglycerate synthase is an enzyme that catalyzes the chemical reaction

GDP-mannose + 3-phospho-D-glycerate  GDP + 2-(alpha-D-mannosyl)-3-phosphoglycerate

Thus, the two substrates of this enzyme are GDP-mannose and 3-phospho-D-glycerate, whereas its two products are GDP and 2-(alpha-D-mannosyl)-3-phosphoglycerate.

This enzyme belongs to the family of glycosyltransferases, specifically the hexosyltransferases.  The systematic name of this enzyme class is GDP-mannose:3-phosphoglycerate 3-alpha-D-mannosyltransferase. This enzyme is also called MPG synthase.

References

 

EC 2.4.1
Enzymes of unknown structure